Allen was an unincorporated community in Lincoln County, West Virginia, United States.

References

Unincorporated communities in Lincoln County, West Virginia
Unincorporated communities in West Virginia